Andrzej Wiśniewski (13 January 1956 – 3 April 2022) was a Polish professional football manager.

Career
In 2001, for a short time Wiśniewski managed Wisła Płock, which fell to the second division. In 2002, he coached the Palestine national team. Later he worked with 3rd and 2nd league teams, including with Jeziorak Iława, Drwęca Nowe Miasto Lubawskie, which was promoted in the 2004–05 season to the second league, but after several defeats in its class tournament he was released. He was also assistant to Dariusz Wdowczyk at Polonia Warsaw in the 1999–2000 championship. 

On 26 April 2006, Wiśniewski became the coach of the first team of Polonia Warsaw, succeeding Jan Żurek, but he stayed in this position for too long and became sports director of Polonia. Then he resumed in the third league adventure Unia Janikowo, which, however, lost in Division II playoffs. He was replaced by Artur Polehojko. In autumn 2007, he signed the contract and took over manager function of the KSZO Ostrowiec Świętokrzyski on 1 January 2008.

Death
Wiśniewski died of a heart attack on 3 April 2022, at the age of 66.

References

External links
Profile at Soccerway.com
Profile at Soccerpunter.com

1956 births
2022 deaths
People from Giżycko
Polish footballers
Association football defenders
Hutnik Warsaw players
Polish football managers
Expatriate football managers in the State of Palestine
Palestine national football team managers
Polish expatriate football managers
Wisła Płock managers
Jeziorak Iława managers
Polonia Warsaw managers
KSZO Ostrowiec Świętokrzyski managers